Nerd sniping is a slang term for the action of giving an interesting problem to a person (usually a nerd), thereby consuming all their attention until the problem is solved. It was coined by xkcd author Randall Munroe in the 356th comic of the series on 12 December 2007.

Definition 
Techopedia on November 12, 2020 said:

Nerd sniping is a slang term that describes a particularly interesting problem that is presented to a nerd, often a physicist, tech geek or mathematician.

The nerd stops all activity to devote attention to solving the problem, often at his or her own peril.

It's also been used in the context of employers understanding neurodivergent employees with ADHD:

[ADHD] often produces the ability to 'hyperfocus', a kind of Godzilla attention laser beam that you can train on a complex task, which you won't let go of until it's done to an absurdly high standard. A legit superpower. But moving between tasks when you're in a hyperfocused state? Very hard. The nerd sniping risk is real.

In popular culture 
Beyond science, technology and mathematics, the media agency Colle McVoy published 21 episodes of podcast between 2019 and 2021 called "Nerd Sniped" - "A podcast dedicated to chasing down the curious questions and challenges brands face today"

References

External links 
 Nerd Sniping
 Explain xkcd for Nerd Sniping
 Urban Dictionary: Nerd Sniping
 What is Nerd Sniping? - Definition from Techopedia

Hacker culture
Nerd culture